Nurse Education Today is a peer-reviewed nursing journal covering nursing, midwifery, and healthcare education published by Elsevier. It was established in 1981 and its editor-in-chief is Amanda Kenny. Previous editors were Jean Walker, Peter Birchenall, Martin Johnson and William Lauder.

Abstracting and indexing
The journal is abstracted and indexed in:
Scopus
MEDLINE/PubMed
Current Contents/Life Sciences
Current Contents/Social and Behavioral Sciences
CINAHL
Referativnyi Zhurnal
According to the Journal Citation Reports, the journal has a 2021 impact factor of 3.906.

References

External links

Nursing education
General nursing journals
Elsevier academic journals
Publications established in 1981
English-language journals